POxy 3929 (or P. Oxy. LVIII 3929) is one of four examples of libelli found at Oxyrhynchus in Egypt.

Image: P. Oxy. LVIII 3929 (© Copyright the Egypt Exploration Society).

"This document belongs to the category of certificates of sacrifice issued to those who satisfied the pagan commissioners during the Decian persecution of Christians," according to Oxyrhynchus Papyri. It was issued somewhere between 25 June and 24 July, in the year 250, according to the same source. The text must supply the month Epeiph of the Egyptian calendar, but the day is either not supplied, indistinct, or lost.

Text

See also
Lapsi (Christian)
Oxyrhynchus papyri
Other libelli: POxy 658, POxy 1464, POxy 2990
Warrant to arrest a Christian: POxy 3035

References

External links
'P.Oxy. XLI 3929' at Oxyrhynchus Papyri Project, Oxford University.

POxy 3929
3929
POxy 3929